Manjula Kumara Pathiranage Wijesekara (born 30 January 1984 in Morawaka) is a Sri Lankan high jumper. He has been regarded as one of the most experienced high jumpers to have represented the country mainly in the Asian Games and Commonwealth Games after making his senior debut in 2001. Manjula Kumara represented Sri Lanka at the 2004 Summer Olympics, which was also his only Olympic appearance in his prolific career.

His personal best is 2.27 metres, first achieved in July 2004 in Colombo, became a Sri Lankan record till 2020.

Kumara is a two-time Asian outdoor champion and three-time South Asian Games champion.

Manjula Kumara has also qualified to play in the 2018 Commonwealth Games and will represent Sri Lanka at the 2018 Commonwealth Games, which is also his last Commonwealth Games event in his career.

Competition record

See also
List of Sri Lankans by sport

References

External links
 

1984 births
Living people
People from Matara District
Sri Lankan male high jumpers
Athletes (track and field) at the 2004 Summer Olympics
Olympic athletes of Sri Lanka
Athletes (track and field) at the 2002 Asian Games
Athletes (track and field) at the 2006 Asian Games
Athletes (track and field) at the 2010 Asian Games
Athletes (track and field) at the 2014 Asian Games
Athletes (track and field) at the 2010 Commonwealth Games
Commonwealth Games competitors for Sri Lanka
Athletes (track and field) at the 2018 Commonwealth Games
South Asian Games gold medalists for Sri Lanka
Asian Games competitors for Sri Lanka
South Asian Games medalists in athletics
20th-century Sri Lankan people
21st-century Sri Lankan people